Pierre Arcand (born November 13, 1951) is a Canadian politician, businessman, announcer and journalist in Quebec, Canada. He was the elected Member of the National Assembly of Quebec (MNA) for the provincial riding of Mont-Royal–Outremont in the Island of Montreal from 2007 to 2022. He represented the Quebec Liberal Party. On October 5, 2018 Arcand was named interim leader, following the resignation of Philippe Couillard after the 2018 Quebec general election.

He is the brother of journalist Paul Arcand.

Studies and professional career
Arcand attended Cegep de Saint-Hyacinthe and the HEC (Hautes etudes commerciales) in the 1970s.

Radiophony 
Arcand started his journalistic career in 1978 at CKAC as a news editor and then the radio station's vice-president and the director of information. He was then the senior vice-president of Metromedia CMR Broadcasting Inc. in which the company acquired several radio and television stations across the province but mainly in the Montreal area. Among those included CKOI-FM and CFCF-AM. In 2002, he would become the president of  Corus Entertainment's Corus Quebec radio division who purchased Metromedia's radio stations.

He was involved with the Tel-Aide community organization as an administration member.

Provincial politics 
In 2007, Arcand announced his candidacy in the provincial election for the riding of Mont-Royal which was left vacant by Health minister Philippe Couillard who announced his candidacy in the riding of Jean-Talon in Quebec City replacing Margaret Delisle. He decided to run to improve the province's economic competitiveness.

Following his easy re-election in 2008, Arcand was given his first cabinet position. He was named the Minister for International Relations, replacing Monique Gagnon-Tremblay who was promoted to President of the Treasury Board replacing Monique Jérôme-Forget. Arcand was also given the portfolio of the Francophonie that was left vacant by Benoit Pelletier who did not seek re-election.

Since August 11, 2010, he has held the position of Minister of Sustainable Development, the Environment and Parks. He has also served as a member of the Ministerial Committee for Economic Prosperity and Sustainable Development since January 15, 2009.

He was re-elected in September 2012 and in April 2014 and since April 2014 hold the position of Minister of Energy and Natural Resources, Minister responsible for the Northern Plan, Minister responsible for the Lanaudiere region, and Minister responsible for the Laurentides region. In July 2014 Arcand was awarded with the Fray International Sustainability Award at SIPS 2014/Shechtman International Symposium in Mexico, for his achievements and contributions to sustainable development in politics.

At the dissolution of the house in August 2018, Arcand was Minister responsible for Government Administration and Ongoing Program Review, 
Chair of the Conseil du trésor, and Minister responsible for the Côte-Nord region.

In the 2018 election, Arcand was reelected in the redistributed riding of Mont-Royal–Outremont.

In December 2020, Arcand was found to have been vacationing in Barbados, despite the COVID-19 pandemic and public health advisories to avoid unnecessary travel, and as a result was removed from his role as opposition’s critic for transportation and his position to represent the Quebec Liberals on Montreal issues.

Interim Liberal leader 
On October 5, 2018 Arcand was named interim leader, following the resignation of Philippe Couillard after the 2018 Quebec general election. This role ended when Dominique Anglade became party leader on May 11, 2020.

Guy Ouellette case 
As soon as he was elected interim party leader, Arcand expelled the MNA Guy Ouellette from the Liberal Caucus.

References

External links 
 Pierre Arcand National assembly of Quebec
 Quebec Liberal Party
 Pierre Arcand Biography – Quebec Government

1951 births
Businesspeople from Quebec
French Quebecers
Living people
Members of the Executive Council of Quebec
People from Saint-Hyacinthe
Quebec Liberal Party MNAs
21st-century Canadian politicians